USM Stadium or fully as Stadium Olahraga Universiti Sains Malaysia is a multi-purpose stadium in Penang, Malaysia. The stadium is under the jurisdiction of Universiti Sains Malaysia. 

The stadium formerly hosts football matches for USM from 2009 until 2012, when the team was playing in Liga FAM and Liga Premier.

See also
 Sport in Malaysia

External links
 https://int.soccerway.com/venues/malaysia/stadium-olahraga-usm/
 https://www.panoramio.com/photo/20392084

Football venues in Malaysia
Multi-purpose stadiums in Malaysia
Sports venues in Penang
Universiti Sains Malaysia
Athletics (track and field) venues in Malaysia